Bandar Al Salamah Al Mutairi  (born 28 October 2002) is a Kuwaiti professional soccer player who plays as a attacking midfielder for Al-Arabi.

References

External links

Salamah
Salamah
Salamah
Salamah
Salamah
Salamah
Salamah